Joseph Edwin Jones (born February 21, 1994) is an American football linebacker for the Tennessee Titans of the National Football League (NFL). He played college football at Northwestern.

Early years
Jones began playing football in the eighth grade at the insistence of his mother. He attended Plano High School, where he was an All-conference running back as a senior. He played with a broken bone in his right hand, collecting 710 rushing yards, 8 rushing touchdowns, 11 receptions for 328 yards and 5 touchdowns in eight games.

He also practiced track and basketball, winning a state championship in the 110 metres hurdles as a senior.

College career
Jones accepted a football scholarship from Northwestern University. He was converted into a linebacker as a freshman and had only 6 tackles after his first 2 seasons, playing almost exclusively on special teams. As a junior, he appeared in 13 games, making 18 tackles (14 solo) and one sack.

He became a starter at linebacker as a fifth year senior, playing most of the season with a broken right thumb and his hand and wrist in a cast. He appeared in 13 games (5 starts), while posting 43 tackles, 2 sacks, 2 passes defensed, 3.5 tackles for loss and one fumble recovery. He finished his college career after appearing in 37 games (5 starts), recording 70 tackles (44 solo), 3 sacks, 2 passes defensed and one fumble recovery.

Professional career

Dallas Cowboys
Jones was signed as an undrafted free agent by the Dallas Cowboys after the 2017 NFL Draft on May 12, because his pro day workout would have placed him near the top of the linebackers participating at the NFL Scouting Combine. He was waived on September 2.

Los Angeles Chargers
On September 4, 2017, Jones was signed to the Los Angeles Chargers' practice squad, but was released two days later.

Seattle Seahawks
On September 19, 2017, Jones was signed to the Seattle Seahawks' practice squad.

Denver Broncos
On November 7, 2017, Jones was signed by the Denver Broncos off the Seahawks' practice squad to replace linebacker Kevin Snyder. He appeared in 7 games, playing mainly on special teams.

Jones re-signed with the Broncos on a one-year contract on March 27, 2020.

Tampa Bay Buccaneers
On May 5, 2021, Jones signed with the Tampa Bay Buccaneers. He was waived on August 31, 2021.

Tennessee Titans
On September 13, 2021, Jones was signed to the Tennessee Titans' practice squad. He was promoted to the active roster on October 8, 2021. He was waived on January 4, 2022 and re-signed to the practice squad. After the Titans were eliminated in the Divisional Round of the 2021 playoffs, he signed a reserve/future contract on January 24, 2022.

On August 30, 2022, Jones was waived by the Titans and signed to the practice squad the next day. He was promoted to the active roster on September 12, 2022.

Personal life
Jones married in college and became a father to a daughter in 2016 and again in 2018. He had three part-time jobs during the offseason, two as an exercise trainer and occasionally delivering flowers.

References

External links
Northwestern Wildcats bio

1994 births
Living people
People from Plano, Illinois
Sportspeople from the Chicago metropolitan area
Players of American football from Illinois
American football linebackers
Dallas Cowboys players
Los Angeles Chargers players
Seattle Seahawks players
Denver Broncos players
Tampa Bay Buccaneers players
Tennessee Titans players